
Gmina Krościenko nad Dunajcem is a rural gmina (administrative district) in Nowy Targ County, Lesser Poland Voivodeship, in southern Poland, on the Slovak border.

Villages
Gmina Krościenko nad Dunajcem contains the villages and settlements of Biały Potok, Dziadowe Kąty, Grywałd, Hałuszowa, Kąty, Krościenko nad Dunajcem, Krośnica, Niwki and Tylka.

Neighbouring gminas
Gmina Krościenko nad Dunajcem is bordered by the town of Szczawnica and by the gminas of Czorsztyn, Łącko and Ochotnica Dolna. It also borders Slovakia.

References
Polish official population figures 2006

Kroscienko nad Dunajcem
Nowy Targ County